Gao Hong (born 1964 in Luoyang, Henan) is a composer and performer of the Chinese pipa (pear-shaped lute).

Gao has lived in the United States since 1994. She performs traditional and modern Chinese music, with her groups Spirit of Nature and Beijing Trio (a different group from the Beijing Trio which includes Max Roach, Jon Jang, and Jiebing Chen). She has also participated in cross-cultural musical collaborations, performing with jazz musicians and musicians from other cultures, including James Newton, Issam Rafea and Shubhendra Rao.

She is a graduate of the Central Conservatory of Music in Beijing, where she studied with the pipa master Lin Shicheng, of the Pudong School of pipa playing.  She later became a pipa soloist for the Beijing Song and Dance Troupe.

Discography
Hunting Eagles Catching Swans - Music for Chinese pipa featuring pipa master Lin Shicheng & Gao Hong
Hui/Gathering - Belladonna Baroque Quartet and Gao Hong
Flying Dragon - Gao Hong and Friends around world
Buddhist Temple Music from Beijing - The Beijing Trio.
First Word - Speaking In Tongues
The Spirit of Nature
A Peacock Southeast Flew - Concerto for Pipa and Orchestra
Quiet Forest, Flowing Stream”- New Chinese Pipa Music by Gao Hong
 Pipa Potluck - Lutes Around the World - with an international cast of musicians including two Grammy winners and master performers on the oud, slack key guitar, banjo, classical guitar and others.
 Life As Is - The Blending of Ancient Souls from China and Syria, with Syrian oud player Issam Rafea.
 From Our World to Yours''

Book
Chinese Pipa Method - published 2016 by Hal Leonard

See also 
Pipa
World Voices

References

External links
 Gao Hong official site

1964 births
Living people
Musicians from Minnesota
Musicians from Luoyang
People's Republic of China composers
Pipa players
Carleton College faculty
Educators from Henan